"Binders full of women" is a phrase that was used by Mitt Romney on October 16, 2012, during the second U.S. presidential debate of 2012. Romney used the phrase in response to a question about pay equity, referring to ring binders with résumés of female job applicants submitted to him as governor of Massachusetts. The phrase was depicted by Romney's detractors and the Obama campaign as demeaning and insensitive toward women and was widely mocked. This prompted the phrase's use for political attacks on Romney's positions on "women's issues", as well as the development of an Internet meme.

The comment was used as part of a larger accusation of tone deafness against Romney, including his comments regarding women needing support so that they could get home each day to cook dinner for their families.

Description
When asked about pay equity for women at the debate, Romney said, "I had the chance to pull together a cabinet, and all the applicants seemed to be men. [...] I went to a number of women's groups and said, 'Can you help us find folks?' And they brought us whole binders full of women." Even while the debate was ongoing, comedic commentary about the phrase had begun to be published online.

Reactions

Internet meme
By the day after the debate, a Tumblr blog and posts had been creating illustrated commentary on the phrase, tweets and original works of art had been produced, and a Facebook page about "Binders Full of Women" had received 274,000 likes. Amazon.com received a barrage of satirical reviews for generic binders, with thousands of users marking the reviews as "helpful", moving them to the top of the review pages. A parody Twitter account that portrayed itself as a binder owned by Romney attracted 30,000 followers before the debate was even over.

At a campaign stop Barack Obama referenced the phrase: "I've got to tell you, we don't have to collect a bunch of binders to find qualified, talented, driven young women". The Washington Post stated that "Mitt Romney's 'binders full of women' comment during the second presidential debate did more than go viral; it put women's issues back in the campaign spotlight."

MassGAP response
Romney's statement that he was the one who initiated the recruitment of so many women was challenged by MassGAP, a coalition of women's groups affiliated with the Massachusetts Women's Political Caucus. The coalition issued a statement saying that they had approached both Romney and his opponent's campaigns prior to the election to ask for a commitment to appoint more women to address underrepresented women in Massachusetts' government. The group compiled the names of female applicants and offered them to both Romney and his Democratic opponent Shannon O'Brien before the election.

Legacy
On February 25, 2013, the game show Jeopardy! referenced the meme with a category titled "A Binder Full of Women". The clues were about famous or powerful women.

In 2017, a former Romney aide recovered the binders Romney was referring to and gave them to The Boston Globe.

Also in 2017, Charles C. W. Cooke of National Review criticized media coverage of the scandal, saying that "I am yet to hear an explanation of what was wrong with Romney’s line that isn’t wholly incoherent."

On June 5, 2019, the phrase “binders full of women” was used in the television show The Handmaid’s Tale. In Season 3, Episode 3 of the Hulu series, Commander Joseph Lawrence says: “Binders full of women.” Considering the show’s dystopian genre and premise (in which The United States is largely overtaken and replaced with Gilead, a patriarchal authoritarian regime), the inclusion of this phrase in the fictional show’s script is a satirical nod to the real-life phrase used by Romney.

References

External links
 Video of Mitt Romney's "binders full of women" comment at YouTube

2012 in American politics
2012 in women's history
2012 United States presidential debates
American political catchphrases
Internet memes introduced in 2012
Mitt Romney 2012 presidential campaign
Political Internet memes
Political quotes
United States presidential debates
Works by Mitt Romney